Jill Morris  (born 14 August 1967) is a British diplomat who was the British Ambassador to Italy and non-resident British Ambassador to San Marino, succeeding Christopher Prentice. She is the first female to have held this post.

Early life

Morris was born in Chester, Cheshire and studied Modern Languages at Southampton (MA) and Warwick (MPhil) Universities.

Career
Morris joined the Foreign and Commonwealth Office in 1999. She has had several postings in Europe and within the United Kingdom. On 13 June 2015, during the Birthday Honours, Morris was appointed Companion of the Order of St Michael and St George for services to British foreign policy when serving as Director for Europe.

In December 2015, it was announced that Morris was to be appointed the British Ambassador to Italy and San Marino in July 2016.

References

1967 births
Living people
Companions of the Order of St Michael and St George
Ambassadors of the United Kingdom to Italy
British women ambassadors
People from Chester
Alumni of the University of Southampton
Alumni of the University of Warwick